The Japan Socialist Party was the first legal socialist party in the Empire of Japan. One year after its foundation on February 24, 1906, the party was banned by the Japanese government on February 22, 1907.

Some Chinese Marxists, like , were also influenced by this party.

See also 
 Shakai Taishūtō

References 

Banned political parties
Defunct political parties in Japan
Defunct socialist parties in Asia
Political parties established in 1906
Political parties disestablished in 1907
Socialist parties in Japan
1906 establishments in Japan
1907 disestablishments in Japan
Meiji socialism